The 2003–04 National Soccer League season was the 28th and final season of the National Soccer League in Australia.  Perth Glory were crowned both premiers and champions after winning both the league and grand final.

Overview

The season was remembered as the end of an era for the national league, following the announcement in 2003 that the national competition would be wholly scrapped in response to the Crawford Report into soccer in Australia.  The end of the NSL led to the formation of the A-League, a new national competition that began in 2005.

The season was played as a single league, home-and-away format with top six teams qualifying for a finals series.  Adelaide City withdrew from the competition shortly before the start of the season, leading to the hasty formation of Adelaide United to take their place.

At the beginning of the season, it became obvious that the title would be fought between Perth Glory and Parramatta Power. The Champions Glory lost several of their title-winning squad, most notably their dominant midfield, most of whom to the Power. Parramatta, backed by the Leagues Club, bought big for the last year including notably Ante Milicic and Sasho Petrovski, looking to simply buy the title.

This tactic seemed to be working for a large part of the season, as Power held off major challengers Perth, including a memorable 6–0 hiding, Glory's worst-ever loss. However, a turning point came and Perth began to close the gap both in results and performance terms, and won the Premiership by 6 points in the end. Neither of these sides were ever really matched by other sides during the season. Perhaps the surprise of the season was Adelaide United, who surprised all by making the finals and nearly breaking Perth's all-time average season record attendance in the process, with the biggest crowds of the season. This was most notable as the club was thrown together just a few weeks before the season to take the place of former heavyweight Adelaide City.

In the finals series, notably Perth were comprehensively beaten in both legs of the major semi-final, while Adelaide progressed to the minor semi-final in their first ever season, only to be thrashed by Glory, just highlighting the gap between the top two sides and the rest of the league.

The last ever NSL Grand Final was held at Parramatta Stadium, due to Power winning the major semi-final. The Final was attended by a very measly crowd of just over 9,000, and played in thick rain from kick-off. Power's slick passing game was somewhat hurt by the poor conditions, and the game turned into something of a scrap. No goals were scored in 90 minutes of football, so the game went to extra-time where young Glory striker Nik Mrdja slotted to give Glory their fifth National League title and second NSL Championship, while Power finished the season with nothing to show for their quality and dominance.

Regular season

League table

Home and away season

Round 1

Round 2

Round 3

Round 4

Round 5

Round 6

Round 7

Round 8

Round 9

Round 10

Round 11

Round 12

Round 13

Round 14

Round 15

Round 16

Round 17

Round 18

Round 19

Round 20

Round 21

Round 22

Round 23

Round 24

Round 25

Round 26

Finals

Bracket

Elimination Final 1 (3rd v 6th)

Adelaide United progress on away goals rule (4–4 on aggregate)

Elimination Final 2 (4th v 5th)

South Melbourne progress 2–0 on aggregate

Major semi Final (1st v 2nd)

Parramatta Power progress 6–2 on aggregate

Minor semi Final

Preliminary Final

Grand Final

Individual awards
 Johnny Warren Medal (Player of the Year): Ante Milicic (Parramatta Power)
 U-21 Player of the Year: Alex Brosque (Marconi Stallions)
 Top Scorer(s): Ante Milicic (Parramatta Power – 20 goals)

References

External links
 OzFootball Archives - 2003–04 NSL Season

National Soccer League (Australia) seasons
1
1
Aus
Aus